Edward Coke (1552–1634) was an English barrister, judge and jurist.

Edward Coke may also refer to:

 Edward Coke, 7th Earl of Leicester (1936–2015), British peer
 Edward Coke, Viscount Coke (1719–1753), British Member of Parliament
 Edward Coke (1758–1837), British politician and landowner
 Edward Coke (1824–1889), British politician
 Sir Edward Coke, 1st Baronet (died 1669) of the Coke baronets
 Sir Edward Coke, 3rd Baronet (1648–1727) of the Coke baronets

See also
 Edward Coke Crow (1861–1945), United States Attorney General
 Edward Cook (disambiguation)
 Edward Cooke (disambiguation)